Rodney Pyles (born June 21, 1945) is an American politician who served in the West Virginia House of Delegates from the 51st district from 2016 to 2020.

In 2018, Democrats — including Pyles — swept all five seats in the 51st district, the largest multi-member district in the House. As a result, the Monongalia County delegates, all Democrats, called themselves “The Fab Five” and frequently voted and worked together on bills. This was especially notable given that there was only one Democratic member of the delegation just four years earlier, after the 2014 elections. In 2020, Pyles was defeated for re-election by former Republican Delegate Joe Statler, breaking the all-Democratic delegation.

References

1945 births
Living people
Democratic Party members of the West Virginia House of Delegates
21st-century American politicians